Dodecahydroxycyclohexane is an organic compound with molecular formula  or  or . It is a sixfold geminal diol with a cyclohexane backbone and can be regarded as a sixfold hydrate of cyclohexanehexone.

Dihydrate
The dihydrate  can be crystallized from methanol as colorless plates or prisms, that decomposes at about 100 °C.

This compound was synthesized by J. Lerch in 1862 by oxidation of benzenehexol  or tetrahydroxy-p-benzoquinone  and characterized by R. Nietzki and others in 1885, although the product was for a long time assumed to be hexaketocyclohexane with water of crystallization.

Indeed, this product is still commonly marketed as cyclohexanehexone octahydrate, hexaketocyclohexane octahydrate, triquinoyl octahydrate and similar names. Its true nature was suspected since the 1950s or earlier, but was confirmed by X-ray diffraction analysis only in 2005.

See also
Decahydroxycyclopentane

References

Cyclitols
Cyclohexanols
Geminal diols